Automotive superlatives include attributes such as the smallest, largest, fastest, lightest, best-selling, and so on.

This list (except for the firsts section) is limited to automobiles built after World War II, and lists superlatives for earlier vehicles separately. The list is also limited to production road cars that:

Are constructed principally for retail sale to consumers for personal use transporting people on public roads. No commercial or industrial vehicles are included
Have had 25 or more instances made by the original vehicle manufacturer offered for sale to the public in new condition (cars modified by either professional tuners or individuals are not eligible)
Are street-legal in their intended markets and capable of passing any official tests or inspections required to be granted this status

Calendar years rather than "model years" are used except when explicitly marked as otherwise.

Vehicle dimensions

Length

 Longest
 Car
 Current production car –  – 2018 Rolls-Royce Phantom EWB
 Production car –  – 1962–1977 eight door Checker Aerobus
 Production station wagon –  – 1962–1977 nine door Checker Aerobus
 Limited production coupe –  – 1931 Bugatti Royale Kellner
Production convertible –  – 1934–1935 (for the 1934–1935 model years) Cadillac V-16
 Truck
 Pickup truck –  – Ford F-250/F-350 crew cab long bed
 SUV –  – 2022 Cadillac Escalade ESV
 Van –  Iveco Daily
 Shortest
 Current production car –  – 2011 Peel P50
 Production car –  – 1962–1965 Peel P50
 Two seat production car –  – Peel Trident
 Four seat production car –  – 1957–1959 BMW 600 (international)
 SUV / dually truck –  – 1950–1952 Crosley Farm-O-Road
 Four-wheel-drive car –  – 1959–1962 M422 Mighty Mite
 Light military truck –  – 1959–1962 M422 Mighty Mite

Width (without mirrors)

Widest
Car
Current production car –  – Lamborghini Countach LPI 800-4
Production car –  – 1953–54 (for the 1954 model year) Chrysler Crown Imperial
Production convertible –  – 2004 Maserati MC12
Production station wagon –  – 1959–60 (for the 1960 model year) Mercury Colony Park/Commuter, and Ford Country Squire/Country Sedan/Ranch Wagon
Limited production convertible –  (armoured) – 1938–1943 Mercedes-Benz 770 W150
Pickup truck –  – Chevrolet Silverado 3500HD
SUV
SUV –  – 1991–2006 (for the 1992–2006 model years) Hummer H1
Van
Current van –  Ford Transit
Van –  Mercedes-Benz Vario
Narrowest
Current production car –  – all Japanese kei cars
Current production car (International) –  – Kia Picanto
Production car –  – 1946 Larmar

Height

Tallest
Car
Current production car –  – Daihatsu Wake/Hijet Caddie/Toyota Pixis Mega
Production car –  – 1904–1909 Fiat 60 HP
Pickup Truck –  – Brabus Unimog U500 Black Edition
SUV –  – Lincoln Navigator
Van –  Mercedes-Benz Sprinter 906 L4H3
Lowest
Current production car –  – Caterham 7 CSR
Production car –  – 1956–1958 Lotus Eleven
Limited production car –  – 1969 Probe 15

Wheelbase

Longest
Car
Current production car –  – 2016 Mercedes-Maybach Pullman
Production car –  – 2016 Mercedes-Maybach Pullman
Production convertible –  (29 produced) – 1933–1937 (for the 1934–1937 model years) Cadillac V-16
Production coupe –  (20 produced) – 1933–1937 (for the 1934–1937 model years) Cadillac V-16
Production station wagon –  – 1950–51 (for the 1951 model year) Chrysler New Yorker Town and Country
Limited production car –  – 1937 Duesenberg Model J "Father Divine"
Limited production coupe –  – 1931 Bugatti Royale Kellner
Limited production sedan –  – 1937 Duesenberg Model J "Father Divine"
Pickup Truck –  – Ford F-250/F-350 crew cab long bed
SUV
Current SUV –  – Chevrolet Suburban, GMC Yukon XL, and Cadillac Escalade ESV
SUV –  – Ford Excursion
Van –  Nissan NV400, Opel/Vauxhall Movano and Renault Master
Shortest
Current production car –  – Smart Fortwo
Production car –  – 1962–1965 Peel P50

Track

Widest front
Car
Production car –  – 2011 Lamborghini Aventador
Production station wagon –  – 1968–1978 (for the 1969–1978 model years) Mercury Colony Park/Marquis/Monterey
Pickup truck –  – 2019 Ram 5500 Regular Cab 120 CA
SUV
Current SUV –  – Cadillac Escalade, Chevrolet Suburban and GMC Yukon
SUV –  – 1991–2006 (for the 1992–2006 model years) Hummer H1
Van –  Ford E-150 regular wagon
Widest rear
Car
Production car –  BMW i8
Production convertible –  – BMW i8 Roadster
Production station wagon –  – 1968–1978 (1969–1978 model years) Mercury Colony Park/Marquis/Monterey and Ford Country Squire/Country Sedan/Ranch Wagon
Pickup truck –  – Ram 3500 DRW
SUV
Current SUV –  – Cadillac Escalade, Chevrolet Suburban and GMC Yukon
SUV –  – 1991–2006 (for the 1992–2006 model years) Hummer H1
Van –  Ford E-350 super duty dual rear wheels
Narrowest front –  – 1962–1965 Peel P50
Narrowest rear –  – 1953–1961 Isetta

Curb weight

Heaviest
Car
Production car –  – 2017 Mercedes-Maybach S600 Pullman Guard
Production convertible –  (29 produced) – 1933–1937 (for the 1934–1937 model years) Cadillac V-16
Production coupe –  (20 produced) – 1933–1937 (for the 1934–1937 model years) Cadillac V-16
Production station wagon –  – 1973–74 (for the 1974 model year) Buick Estate and Oldsmobile Custom Cruiser (with third seat and woodgrain)
Limited production convertible –  (armoured) – 1938–1943 Mercedes-Benz 770 W150
Limited production coupe –  – 1931 Bugatti Royale Kellner
Pickup truck –  – International XT
SUV
Current SUV –  – 2008 Conquest Knight XV
SUV –  – 2008 Conquest Knight XV
Van
Current van –  – Iveco Daily
Van –  – Mercedes-Benz Vario
Lightest
Current production car –  – Caterham 7 170
Production car –  – 1962–1965 Peel P50

Engines

Engine displacement

Smallest
 Current production car –  – Caterham 7 160, as well as all kei cars
 Production car
 Single-cylinder –  – 1962–1965 Peel P50
 Two-cylinder –  – 1967–1972 Honda N360
 Three-cylinder –  – 1967 Suzuki Fronte
 Four-cylinder –  – 1963–1967 Honda T360
 Five-cylinder –  – 1980–1982 Audi 100
 Six-cylinder –  – 1931–1933 Triumph 12-6 Scorpion
 Eight-cylinder –  – 1967–1969 Alfa Romeo 33 Stradale and 1975–1980 Ferrari 208 GT4
 Ten-cylinder –  – 2010–2012 Lexus LFA
 Twelve-cylinder –  – 1948–1950 Ferrari 166 Inter

Largest

 Current production car –  – W16 2017 Bugatti Chiron
 Production car 
 Three-cylinder –  – 2020 Koenigsegg Gemera
 Four-cylinder –  – 1999–2006 Mitsubishi Pajero – 4M4 engine
 Five-cylinder –  – 2007–2012 Chevrolet Colorado
 Six-cylinder – 5.0 litres (308 cu in) – 1950–1956 Hudson Hornet
 Eight-cylinder –  – 1970–1976 Cadillac Eldorado
 Ten-cylinder –  – 2013–2017 Dodge Viper
 Twelve-cylinder –  – 1935–1938 Hispano-Suiza J12

Power

Highest power by engine type

Petrol engine (naturally aspirated) –  – Aston Martin Valkyrie,  Cosworth V12
Petrol engine (forced induction) –  – Bugatti Centodieci,  W16
Diesel engine (naturally aspirated) –  – 1992 Ford F-250/F-350,  – International Harvester IDI V8
Diesel engine (forced induction) –  – Audi Q7 V12 TDI,  twin-turbo TDI V12
Electric motor –  – Lotus Evija

Highest power by body style
2-door coupé –  – 2020 Lotus Evija; four electric motors
4-door sedan –  – 2022 Tesla Model S Plaid; three electric motors
Pickup truck/ute –  2021 Ram TRX;  V8 petrol
SUV –  2021 Dodge Durango SRT Hellcat;  V8 petrol
Minivan –  2007 Mercedes-Benz R 63 AMG 4MATIC;  V8 petrol
Van –  2021 Chevrolet Express and GMC Savana;  V8 petrol
Heavy truck – non-hybrid  Shacman X6000;  V8 diesel

Highest specific power (power-to-weight ratio)

Naturally aspirated (limited production) –  – 2007 Caparo T1 –  and 
Forced-induction (limited production) –  – 2020 SSC Tuatara –  and

Highest specific engine output (power/unit displacement)

Highest power by cylinder count (Production Cars)

 Two-cylinder –  –   – 2007 Fiat 500
 Three-cylinder –  –   – 2020 Koenigsegg Gemera
 Four-cylinder –  –   – 2022 Mercedes-AMG C 63 S E Performance 4MATIC+
 Five-cylinder –  –   – 2022 KTM X-Bow GT-XR
 Six-cylinder –  –   – 2020 Nissan GT-R50 by Italdesign
 Eight-cylinder –  –   – 2020 Hennessey Venom F5
 Ten-cylinder –  –   – 2015 Dodge Viper
 Twelve-cylinder –  –   – 2021 Aston Martin Valkyrie
 Sixteen-cylinder –  –   – 2022 Bugatti Chiron Super Sport

Torque

Highest torque by engine type

Forced induction petrol engine –  – 2020 SSC Tuatara,  V8
Naturally aspirated petrol engine –  – 2013-2017 Dodge Viper,  V10
Forced induction diesel engine –  – 2020 (2021 MY) RAM Heavy Duty,  I6
Naturally aspirated diesel engine –  – 1988–94 Ford F-250/350 IDI diesel,  V8
Electric motor –  – 2021 Rimac Nevera
Hybrid engine –  – Koenigsegg Gemera

Highest torque by body style
Car –  – 2020 Koenigsegg Gemera, hybrid 3-cylinder + 4 electric motors,
Pickup truck –  – 2020 (2021 MY) RAM Heavy Duty,  R6
SUV –  – Audi Q7 V12 TDI,  V12 diesel
Van –  – 2014 Chevrolet Express and GMC Savana,  V8 diesel

Highest specific torque (torque/unit displacement)
The mean effective pressure (MEP) is a useful comparison tool, giving the average cylinder pressure exerted on the piston.

Fuel economy

Most economical

The following are all vehicles once certified for sale in the United States. Some vehicles from other countries have better fuel economy. Figures (showed in miles per US gallon units) are based on laboratory estimates, not consumer data.

All-diesel production vehicle – 1984 Nissan Sentra with 41 combined / 37 city / 46 highway.
All-petrol production vehicle – 1986 Chevrolet Sprint ER with 48 combined / 44 city / 53 highway
All natural gas production vehicle – 2012 Honda Civic GX with 31 combined / 27 city / 38 highway
E85 production vehicle – 2013 Ford Focus SFE FWD FFV with 22 combined / 19 city / 27 highway
Production electric hybrid – 2021 Hyundai Ioniq Hybrid (Ioniq Blue) with 59 combined / 58 city / 60 highway
Production plug-in electric hybrid – 2014/2016 BMW i3 REx with 117 combined MPGe (EV mode) and 39 MPG combined city/highway (petrol)
Production all-electric vehicle – 2021 Tesla Model 3 Standard Range Plus RWD with 142 combined / 150 city / 133 highway MPGe

The following are as sold in Europe:

Volkswagen XL1, diesel-electric PHEV,  on the New European Driving Cycle

Price

Most expensive (production) –  – Bugatti Chiron Sport
 Least expensive (production) –  – 1922 Briggs & Stratton Flyer
 Most expensive (auction) –  1962 Ferrari 250 GTO (2018)
Most expensive (private sale) –  ( at June 2018 exchange rates) 1963 Ferrari 250 GTO (2018)
Most expensive (concept car) –  2005 Maybach Exelero

Performance

Acceleration
Quickest  with 1 foot rollout – 1.85 seconds – Rimac Nevera
Quickest  with standing start – 1.97 seconds – Rimac Nevera
Quickest  – 3.61 seconds – Rimac Nevera
Quickest  – 5.23 seconds – Rimac Nevera
Quickest  – 
Quickest  – 22.82 seconds – Koenigsegg Regera

Top speed
Highest top speed (forced induction petrol engine) – Bugatti Chiron Super Sport 300+ – 
Highest top speed (naturally aspirated engine) – McLaren F1 – 
Highest top speed (forced induction diesel engine) – BMW Alpina D5 S – 
Highest top speed (electric production vehicle) – Rimac Nevera –

Highest rpm redline
Internal combustion piston-engined production car – Gordon Murray T.50 – 12,100 rpm
Internal combustion Wankel rotary-engined production car – Mazda RX-8 – 9,000 rpm 
Electric production vehicle – Tesla Model S – 18,000 rpm

Sales

Best-selling models

 Best-selling vehicle nameplate – Toyota Corolla (more than 50,000,000 sold in 12 generations since 1966)
 Best-selling single model – Volkswagen Beetle (21,529,464 of the same basic design sold worldwide between 1938 and 2003)
 Best single-year sales – 1.36 million – 2005 Toyota Corolla
 Best single-month sales – 126,905 – July 2005 Ford F-Series

Firsts
Mostly full-production vehicles are listed here. Many were preceded by racing-only cars. This list mainly includes developments that led to widespread adoption across the automotive industry.

Industry
First Self-Propelled Automobile - 1770 Nicolas-Joseph Cugnot
First fully functioning automobile – 1885 Benz Patent-Motorwagen
First production automobile – 1888 Benz Patent-Motorwagen
First automotive proving ground – 1915 Dodge Brothers Test Track, Hamtramck, Michigan
First auto company technical institute – 1919 General Motors Institute (now Kettering University)

Engine types
Straight engines
First production straight-twin engine – 1895 Panhard et Levassor and 1898 Decauville Voiturelle 
First production straight-three engine – 1953 DKW F91 and 1956 Saab 93
First production straight-four engine – 1908 Ford Model T
First production Straight-five engine – 1974 Mercedes-Benz W115 300D
First straight-six engine – 1903 Napier 
First production straight-eight engine – 1918 Isotta Fraschini
V engines
First production V2 engine – 1889 Daimler steel-wheel car
First production V4 engine – 1922 Lancia Lambda
First production V6 engine – 1911 Delahaye Type 44
First V8 engine – 1904 Marmon
First production V8 engine – 1910 De Dion-Bouton CJ
First V10 engine – 1987 Lamborghini P140
First production V10 engine – 1991 Dodge Viper
First production V12 engine – 1915 Packard Twin-Six, the 1915 National V12 engine, and the 1917 Weidely Pathfinder 
First V16 engine – 1929 Maserati Tipo V4
First production V16 engine – 1930 Cadillac V-16
Flat engines
First production flat-twin engine – 1900 Lanchester 8 hp Phaeton
First flat-four engine – 1900 Benz 20 hp racing car
First production flat-four engine – 1901 Wilson-Pilcher
First flat-six engine – 1904 Wilson-Pilcher
First production flat-six engine – 1948 Tucker 48
First flat-eight engine – 1962 Porsche 804 Formula One car
First flat-twelve engine – 1964 Honda RA271 Formula One car
First production flat-twelve engine – 1973 – Ferrari 365 GT4 BB
W engines
 First production W engine – 2001 Volkswagen Passat W8 
First production W12 engine – 2001 Audi A8 W12
First production W16 engine – 2005 – Bugatti Veyron

Engine technologies
Engine configuration & other miscellaneous fundamental construction details
First engine with removable cylinder head – 1889 Bernardi
First square engine – 1900 Georges Richard 3 1/2HP
First variable displacement engine – 1905 Sturtevant 38/45 six
First counterbalanced crankshaft – 1908 Mercer Type 35
First aluminum engine block – 1922 Lancia Lambda
First split-plane crankshaft – 1922 (for the 1923 model year) Cadillac V8 engine
First crankcase ventilation system – 1925 (for the 1926 model year) Cadillac V8 engine
First aluminum cylinder head – 1928 Fiat
First diesel engined production car – 1935 Citroen Rosalie
First gas turbine car – 1950 Rover
First functional fuel-cell electric vehicle (FCEV) – 1966 GM/Chevrolet Electrovan
First production fuel-cell electric vehicle (FCEV) – 2001 Hyundai Santa Fe FCEV and 2002 Honda FCX
First Miller cycle engine – 1996 Mazda Millenia
First Atkinson cycle engine – 1997 Toyota Prius
First Hydrogen vehicle – 2005 BMW Hydrogen 7 (Germany)

Wankel engines
First Wankel engine – 1964 NSU Spider
First front-wheel-drive car with Wankel engine – 1966 NSU Ro 80
First 2-rotor Wankel engine – 1966 NSU Ro 80
First 3-rotor Wankel engine – 1969 Mercedes C111
First 4-rotor Wankel engine – 1970 Mercedes C111
First turbocharged Wankel engine – 1982 Mazda Luce and Cosmo

Valvetrain
First overhead valve (OHV) engine – 1889 Bernardi
First overhead camshaft (OHC) engine – 1903 Marr Auto Car
First sleeve valve – 1909 Daimler (developed functional system from 1903 Knight Engine design)
First double overhead camshaft (DOHC) engine – 1913 Peugeot

Multi-valve engines
First limited production 3-valve engine – 1912 Bugatti Type 18
First limited production 4-valve engine – 1913 Peugeot Grand Prix
First limited production 5-valve engine – 1921 Peugeot Grand Prix
First production 3-valve engine – 1924 Bugatti Type 35
First production 4-valve engine – 1971 Ford Escort Mk1 RS1600
First multi-valve turbocharged engine – 1981 Maserati Biturbo (AM452)
First 6-valve engine – 1985 Maserati Biturbo 2.0 L V6 36v 261 hp (prototype)
First production 5-valve engine – 1989 Mitsubishi Dangan ZZ
First 3-valve diesel engine – 1989 Citroën XM
First 4-valve diesel engine – 1993 Mercedes-Benz C-Class (OM604 engine)

Variable valve timing (VVT)
First Variable Valve Timing (VVT) engine – 1980 Alfa Romeo Spider 2.0 L
First electronic VVT – 1983 Alfa Romeo Spider (All models)
First cam-switching VVT – 1989 Honda Integra RSi/XSi B16A VTEC 1.6 L DOHC I4
First VVT passenger car diesel engine – 2010 Mitsubishi ASX 4N13 1.8 L DOHC I4

Internal combustion engine cooling
 First water-cooled automobile engine – 1901 Mercedes 35 hp
 First air-cooled automobile engine – 1902 Franklin
 First production air-cooled V8 engine – 1934 Tatra 77
Aspiration
First supercharged car – 1921 Mercedes 6/25/40 hp
First twin-supercharged car – 1935 Alfa Romeo 8C 2900
First turbocharged car – 1961 (for the 1962 model year) Oldsmobile F-85 (Turbo Jetfire)
First application of a wastegate to regulate a turbocharger's boost – 1961 (for the 1962 model year) Oldsmobile F-85 (Turbo Jetfire)
First twincharged car – 1985 Lancia Delta S4 Stradale
First variable-geometry turbocharger – 1988 Honda Legend Wing Turbo
First variable-geometry turbocharger (diesel) – 1991 Fiat Croma
First twin-turbocharged car – 1981 Maserati Biturbo
First triple-turbocharged car – 2012 BMW M550d xDrive
First quad-turbocharged car – 1991 Bugatti EB110

Fuel systems
First carburetor – 1889 Bernardi
First carburetor air filter – 1889 Bernardi
First automatic choke – 1931 (for the 1932 model year) Oldsmobile
First four-barrel carburetor – 1940 (for the 1941 model year) Buick (Compound Carburetion)

Fuel injection (FI)
First FI engine – 1910 Adams-Farwell Diesel
First non-diesel FI engine – 1952 Goliath GP700 and Gutbrod
First gasoline direct injection engine – 1952 Goliath GP700 and Gutbrod
First Electronic Fuel Injection (EFI) – 1957 Rambler Rebel (prototypes)
First limited production EFI – 1957 (for the 1958 model year) Chrysler 300D, DeSoto Adventurer, Dodge D-500 and Plymouth Fury
First full mass-production EFI – 1968 D-Jetronic on Volkswagen Type 3 and Type 4
First diesel direct injection engine – 1987 Fiat Croma Turbo D i.d.
First turbocharged diesel direct injection engine – 1987 Fiat Croma Turbo D i.d.
First electronic gasoline direct injection – 1996 Mitsubishi Galant/Legnum 4G93 GDI I4
First passenger car common rail diesel direct injection engine – 1997 Alfa Romeo 156 JTD
First turbocharged gasoline direct injection engine – 2000 Mitsubishi Pajero IO 4G93

Ignition systems
First contact breaker point ignition – 1910 Cadillac Model Thirty / Delco
First optional electronic ignition – 1963 General Motors / Delco
First standard electronic ignition – 1968 Fiat Dino 2.0 / Dino 206 GT (Magneti Marelli Dinoplex)
First distributor-less ignition – Citroën 2CV (???)

General miscellany
First California Ultra Low Emission Vehicle – M.Y. 1998 Honda Accord 
First California Super Ultra Low Emission Vehicle – M.Y. 2000 Honda Accord I4
First flex-fuel vehicle (bioethanol and gasoline) – 1908 Ford Model T

Electric vehicles
First practical electric car – 1881 Gustave Trouvé electric vehicle
First mass-produced electric car – 1995 Peugeot 106 Electric / Citroën Saxo Electrique

Hybrid vehicles
First gas-electric hybrid – 1899 Lohner–Porsche Mixte
First modern hybrid car – 1904 Auto-Mixte (Belgium)
First mass-produced hybrid car – 1997 Toyota Prius
First hybrid bus – 1997 Hino
First hybrid SUV – 1997 Toyota RAV4 EV
First all-wheel drive hybrid – 2003 (for the 2004 model year) Ford Escape Hybrid
First hybrid luxury car – 2004 (for the 2005 Japanese model year) Lexus RX 400h (introduced January 2004)
First mild hybrid pickup truck – 2004 (for the 2005 model year) Chevrolet Silverado/GMC Sierra Hybrid
First full hybrid pickup truck – 2008 (for the 2009 model year) Chevrolet Silverado/GMC Sierra Hybrid
First hybrid heavy truck – 2018 Sisu Polar Hybrid
First 4-fuel hybrid – 2010 Monte Carlo Automobile Quadrifuel (powered with bio-ethanol, hydromethane, gasoline and LPG)

Plug-in electric vehicles
First all-electric car with lithium-ion battery – 1998 Nissan Altra
First series production plug-in hybrid – 1997 Audi Duo
First series production all-electric car available in global markets – 2011 Nissan Leaf
First series production plug-in hybrid car available in global markets – 2011 Chevrolet Volt/Opel Ampera
First series production all-electric commercial van – 1989 Citroën C15 Electrique
First series production all-electric long range highway capable car – 2009 Tesla Roadster
First series production all-electric luxury car – 2012 Tesla Model S
First series production plug-in SUV – 2013 Mitsubishi Outlander PHEV
First series production all-electric SUV – 2016 Tesla Model X

Body
First tricar – 1885 Benz Patent Motorwagen
First motorized truck – October 1896 Daimler
First sedan/saloon – 1900 Renault Voiturette
First production station wagon (estate) – 1908 Ford Model T
First production closed-body car – 1910 Cadillac Model Thirty
First cyclecar – 1910 GN/1910 Bédélia
First aerodynamic design – 1914 A.L.F.A. 40/60 HP Aerodinamica
First production aerodynamic design – 1921 Rumpler Tropfenwagen
First monocoque – 1922 Lancia Lambda
First shatter-resistant windshield glass – 1925 (for the 1926 model year) Cadillac
First minivan – 1932 Stout Scarab
First all-aluminium body – 1933 Riley Nine Kestrel
First coupé convertible – 1934 Peugeot 401 D Eclipse
First Pickup / Utility vehicle (Ute) – 1934 Ford Coupé utility
First retractable hardtop roof – 1934 Pourtout Lancia Belna Eclipse (coachbuilt)
First production retractable hardtop roof – 1957 Ford Fairlane 500 Skyliner
First flush mounted gas door – 1936 Cord 810
First fully boxed frame – 1938 ERA R4D (racing car)
First fiberglass body – 1946 Stout Scarab Experimental (also first monocoque fiberglass body)
First safety windshield – 1947 (for the 1948 model year) Tucker (popout safety glass)
First hardtop – 1948 (for the 1949 model year) Cadillac Coupe de Ville, Buick Roadmaster Riviera and Oldsmobile 98 Holiday
First production minivan – 1946 Chenard et Walcker CHV
First limited production fiberglass body – 1951 (for the 1952 model year) Woodill Wildfire
First production fiberglass body – 1952 (for the 1953 model year) Chevrolet Corvette
First hatchback – 1953 Aston Martin DB2/4
First body made of recycled material – 1954  Trabant P70
First 4-door hardtop – 1955 (middle of the model year) Buick Century Riviera and Special Riviera and Oldsmobile 98 Holiday and 88 Holiday
First hardtop station wagon – 1955 (for the 1956 model year) Rambler Six and V8
First production fiberglass monocoque – 1956 Berkeley SA322
First Mini MPV – 1956 Fiat 600 Multipla
First fiberglass bodied convertible – 1952 (for the 1953 model year) Chevrolet Corvette
First fiberglass bodied 4-door Sedan – 1970 Anadol A2
First fiberglass bodied Station wagon / Estate car – 1973 Anadol SV-1600
First factory clear-coat paint job – 1977 Lincoln Versailles
First active aerodynamics - 1984 Alfa Romeo 90
First electric boot spoiler – 1986 Lancia Thema 8.32
First all-aluminium space frame – 1990 Honda NSX
First carbon fibre monocoque – 1993 McLaren F1
First stress-bearing engine acting like a structural member – 1995 Ferrari F50
First Crossover – 1979 AMC Eagle
First single-piece carbon fibre monocoque – 2003 Invicta S1
First fully boxed frame Pickup – 1948 Land Rover Series 1

Transmission
First belt-driven automobile – 1886 Benz Patent-Motorwagen
First chain-driven automobile – 1886 Benz Patent-Motorwagen and 1897 Daimler Phoenix
First shaft-driven automobile – 1908 Mercedes Simplex 35 hp
Manual transmissions
First non-synchronous manual transmission (sliding-mesh design) – 1891 Panhard et Levassor 
First non-synchronous manual transmission (constant-mesh design) – 1928–1929 Cadillac
First reverse gear – 1902 FIAT 8/16 HP
First synchronized transmission – 1924 Isotta Fraschini 8A
First overdrive – 1933 (for the 1934 model year) Chrysler Airflow
First modern cone-synchromesh (on all forward gears) transmission – 1952 Porsche 356
First 3-speed manual – 1894 Bernardi 3.5 HP
First 4-speed manual – 1901 Ceirano 5 HP
First 5-speed manual – 1948 Lancia Ardea Mk3
First 6-speed manual – 1967 Alfa Romeo 33 Stradale
First 7-speed manual – 2011 Porsche 911 (991)
First 8-speed manual – 1931 Maybach DS8
First clutchless manual – 1912 Bollée Type F Torpedo
First production clutchless manual – 1935 REO Self-Shifter, 1937 Oldsmobile 4-speed Automatic Safety Transmission, and 1938–1939 Buick Special 4-speed Self-shifter. 
First electronically controlled clutchless manual – 1991 Ferrari Mondial T Valeo
First sequential manual – 1946 Porsche Type 360 Cisitalia.
First pre-selector gearbox – 1929 Armstrong Siddeley models, 1929 Maybach models, and 1930 Daimler Double-Six
First centrifugal clutch – 1936 Armstrong Siddeley
Automatic transmissions
First automatic transmission – 1939 Oldsmobile (Hydra-Matic; also the first 4-speed automatic)
First torque converter automatic – 1948 (middle of model year) Buick Roadmaster (Dynaflow)
First non-planetary automatic – 1968 Honda (Hondamatic)
First 2-speed automatic – 1947 GM Dynaflow 1948 model year Buick Roadmaster
First 3-speed automatic – 1950 Borg Warner Automatic Drive Studebaker Land Cruiser
First 4-speed automatic – 1939 Oldsmobile (Hydra-Matic; also the first automatic)
First 5-speed automatic – 1989 Nissan Cedric, Nissan Cefiro, Nissan Gloria, Nissan Skyline, Nissan Laurel, (RE5R01A, Jatco/Nissan transmission)
First 6-speed automatic – 2001 BMW 7 Series (E65) (ZF 6HP26)
First 7-speed automatic – 2003 Mercedes-Benz (7G-Tronic)
First 8-speed automatic – 2006 Lexus LS 460
First 9-speed automatic – 2013 Range Rover Evoque
First 10-speed automatic – 2017 Chevrolet Camaro ZL1 and Ford F-150
First self-locking differential – 1939 Alfa Romeo 6C 2500 Super Sport
First limited slip differential – 1955 (for the 1956 model year) Studebaker
<small>Note: In 1939, the Volkswagen Type 82 used a cam and pawl type differential which had a slip-limiting effect.)</small>
First continuously variable transmission (CVT) – 1958 DAF 600 A-TypeFirst electronically-controlled continuously variable transmission (ECVT) – 1987 Subaru Justy E-CVTFirst active differential – 1986 Porsche 959 PSK (limited production of 200 vehicles)
First toroidal continuously variable transmission – 1999 Nissan Cedric and Nissan Gloria
First manumatic (automatic transmission with manual control of gear selection) – 1990 Porsche 911 Tiptronic
First electronically-controlled automated manual transmission – 1985 Isuzu Aska NAVi5 
First modern single-clutch automated manual transmission – 1996 BMW E36 M3 SMG
First dual-clutch transmission – 2003 Volkswagen Golf Mk4 R32 (Direct-Shift Gearbox)
First road car with paddle-shifters – 1997 Ferrari 355 F1

Layout
First rear-engined car – 1886 Benz Patent Motorwagen
First rear-engine, rear-wheel-drive car – 1934 Tatra 77
First rear-engine, four-wheel-drive car – 1940 Volkswagen Kübelwagen
First front-engine, rear-wheel-drive car – 1895 Panhard et Levassor
First front-engine, front-wheel-drive car – 1929 Cord L-29
First front-engine, four-wheel-drive car – 1903 Spyker 60 HP
First front-engined transaxle car – 1898 De Dion-Bouton
First four-wheel-drive car – 1903 Spyker 60 HP
First mid-engined car – 1921 Rumpler Tropfenwagen
First front-wheel-drive car – 1924 Tracta (Gregoire-Tracta)
First mass-produced transverse front-wheel-drive car – 1931 DKW F1
First front mid-engine, front-wheel-drive car – 1934 Citroën Traction Avant
First transverse front-wheel-drive I6 car – 1970 Austin Kimberley and Austin Tasman
First mass-produced four-wheel-drive car – 1955 GAZ M72, 4677 produced 
First and only production vehicles manufactured to a four-seater, rear mid-engined, full-convertible design – 1982 Ferrari Mondial
First transverse four-wheel-drive car – 1983 Fiat Panda 4x4
First mid-engined, four-wheel-drive car – 1983 Peugeot 205 Turbo 16 (homologation special, 200 road cars produced for Group B regulations.)
First transverse front-wheel-drive I5 car – 1991 Volvo 850

Suspension
First front independent suspension – 1898 Decauville
First torsion bar suspension – 1921 Leyland
First hydraulic shock absorbers – 1922 Lancia Lambda
First coil spring / shock absorber suspension – 1922 Lancia Lambda
First fully independent suspension – 1931 Alfa Romeo 8C
First air suspension – 1946 Stout Scarab Experimental
First MacPherson strut suspension – 1949 Ford Vedette
First self-levelling suspension – 1954 Citroën Traction Avant 15/6 "H"
First anti-roll bars – 1955 Citroën DS (front and rear)
First self-levelling suspension on all four wheels – 1955 Citroën DS
First production air suspension – 1956 (for the 1957 model year) Cadillac Eldorado Brougham (standard)
First Chapman strut suspension – 1958 Lotus Elite
First electronic-adjustable suspension dampers – 1981 Nissan Skyline
First electronically-controlled semi-active suspension – 1983 Toyota Soarer (Japan-market model Toyota Electronic Modulated Suspension) and Mitsubishi Galant (Electronic Steering Chassis)
First active air suspension – 1987 Mitsubishi Galant active ECS
First fully active suspension without anti-roll bars: 1989 on Toyota Celica: Toyota Active Control Suspension
First semi-active hydraulic suspension – 1990 Citroën XM (Hydractive)
First semi-active suspension scanning the road ahead (sonar) – 1990 Nissan Leopard/Nissan Cedric/Nissan Maxima/Nissan J30 DUET-SS Super Sonic Suspension
First active anti-roll bars – 1994 Citroën Xantia Activa (Systeme Citroën de Contrôle Actif du Roulis)
First active suspension optically scanning the road ahead – 2013 Mercedes-Benz S-Class (W222) (MAGIC BODY CONTROL with ROAD SURFACE SCAN)

Brakes
First four-wheel brakes – 1910 Isotta Fraschini
First power brakes – 1919 Hispano-Suiza H6 (mechanically assisted and 4-wheel)
First hydraulic power brakes – 1921 Duesenberg Model A (4-wheel)
First vacuum-assist power brakes – 1927 (for the 1928 model year) Pierce-Arrow
First inboard drum brakes – 1937 Lancia Aprilia
First disc brakes – 1948 (for the 1949 model year) Chrysler Crown Imperial (4-wheel and standard)
First inboard disc brakes – 1955 Citroën DS19
First diagonally split, dual brake circuits – 1962 Saab 95/96
First antilock braking system – 1966 Jensen FF (Dunlop Maxaret system, previously used in aviation)
First electrical & electronic antilock braking system – 1969 (for the 1970 model year) Lincoln Continental Mark III (standard)
First 4-wheel electrical & electronic antilock braking system – 1970 (for the 1971 model year) Imperial
First asbestos-free brake pads – 1983 Saab Automobile
First regenerative brakes – 1996 GM EV1 (leased, not sold)
First electro-hydraulic brakes – 2001 Toyota Prius
First electric parking brake – 2002 BMW E65/E66

Driver aids
First steering wheel – 1894 Panhard
First speedometer – 1901 Oldsmobile
First windscreen wiper – 1903 Mary Anderson (inventor)
First electromechanical vehicle horn – 1908 Klaxon
First tilt-away steering wheel – 1912 Peerless
First standard rear-view mirror – 1912 Marmon
First adjustable steering column – 1913 Lancia Theta
First dash-mounted fuel gauge – 1914 Studebaker
First power windscreen wiper – 1916 Willys-Knight
First turn signals – 1919 Phianna
First electric windscreen wiper – 1922 William M. Folberth (inventor)
First windscreen defogger – 1927 (for the 1928 model year) Studebaker
First horn ringed steering wheel – 1935 (for the 1936 model year) Cord 810
First windscreen washer – 1936 (for the 1937 model year) Studebaker
First rear window defogger – 1947 (for the 1948 model year) Cadillac
First power steering – 1950 (for the 1951 model year) Chrysler Imperial
First cruise control – 1956 (for the 1957 model year) Imperial
First trip computer – 1958 Saab GT750
First adjustable control pedals – 1964 Marcos GT
First tilt/telescope steering wheel – 1964 (for the 1965 model year) Cadillac
First traction control system – 1970 (for the 1971 model year) full-size Buick (MaxTrac)
First LED display – 1976 Aston Martin Lagonda instrument cluster
First original-equipment (OEM) Citizens Band radio – 1976 (for the 1977 model year) Lincoln, Cadillac, Buick (except Skyhawk), Oldsmobile (except Omega and Starfire) and Pontiac (except Ventura, Sunbird and Astre)
First electronic trip computer – 1978 (in middle of model year) Cadillac Seville
First navigation system – August 1981 Honda Accord (analog, dealer-installed)
First parking sensor – 1982 Toyota Corona
First built-in cup holder – 1983 Dodge Caravan/Plymouth Voyager
First Rain-Sensing Windshield Wipers – 1984 Nissan 200SX and Silvia
First CRT display – 1984 Buick Riviera computer controlled instrument cluster
First electronic four-wheel steering – 1985 Nissan Skyline HICAS
First automotive head-up display (auto-HUD) – 1987 (for the 1988 model year) Oldsmobile Cutlass Supreme
First drive-by-wire throttle – 1988 BMW 750iL
First mechanical four-wheel steering – 1988 Honda Prelude 4WS
First electrochromic rear-view mirror – 1988 Nissan Cedric/Gloria/Cima
First digital navigation system – 1990 Acura Legend
First original-equipment built-in GPS navigation system – 1990 Mazda Eunos Cosmo Type-E CCS (Japan Only)
First Backup camera – 1991 Toyota Soarer Limited (Japan Only)
First dynamic stability control system/Electronic Stability Programme/Vehicle Stability Control – 1995 BMW 7 Series (E38)-(DSC III), Mercedes-Benz S 600 Coupé-(ESP), and Toyota Crown Majesta-(VSC)
First adaptive cruise control – 1995 (for 1996 model year) Mitsubishi Diamante (like the later Toyota Celsior system, this LIDAR did not apply brakes, only throttle&shifting)
First backup sensors – 1995 Mercedes-Benz S-Class
First telematics assist system – 1996 (for the 1997 model year) Cadillac Seville (OnStar) and Lincoln Continental (Motorola RESCU)
First minivans and SUVs with backup sensors – 1999 Ford Windstar and Ford Explorer/Lincoln Navigator
First night vision – 1999 (for the 2000 model year) Cadillac Deville
First lane-departure warning system (LDWS) – 2001 Nissan Cima
First navigation system with voice controls – 2002 Infiniti Q45
First backup camera in North American market – 2002 Infiniti Q45
First radar Collision avoidance system (no autonomous braking) – 2003 Toyota Harrier-Pre-Collision System PCS
First automatic/automated self-parking system – 2003 Toyota Prius IPAS
First Blind Spot Intervention System – 2005 Volvo S80
First Around View Monitor (AVM) – 2007 Infiniti EX35
First Driver drowsiness detection – 2007 on the Volvo S80-Driver Alert Control
First driver eyelid monitoring system – 2008 on the Toyota Crown-Driver Monitoring System
First Synchronized down shift rev-matching system – 2009 Nissan 370Z and Fairlady Z
First active pedestrian avoidance with steering correction – 2013 on Lexus LS (XF40) (Japan only) Toyota Develops New Pedestrian Safety Technology

Passive restraint
First safety padding – 1936 (for the 1937 model year) Chrysler
First seat belts – 1947 (for the 1948 model year) Tucker
First padded dash – 1947 (for the 1948 model year) Tucker
First rear seat belts – 1954 (for the 1955 model year) Ford
First standard seat belts – 1958 Saab GT 750
First shoulder belts – 1959 Volvo PV444/544
First standard shoulder belts – 1959 Volvo 122

Active restraint
 First airbags – 1973 (for the 1974 model year) full-size Cadillac, Buick and Oldsmobile (Air Cushion Restraint System)
 First standard dual frontal airbags – 1987 Porsche 944
 First rear-seat frontal airbag – 1993 Nissan President
 First side torso airbags – 1994 (for the 1995 model year) Volvo 850
 First knee airbag – 1996 Kia Sportage
 First six-airbag system – 1997 Audi A8: 1 side airbag in every door + 2 front airbags.
 First side head airbags – 1997 BMW 7 Series (E38)
 First rear window curtain airbag – 2008 Toyota iQ
 First rear seat centre airbag – 2009 Toyota
 First seatbelt airbags – 2011 Ford Explorer and Lexus LFA
 First front center airbag – 2013 Chevrolet Traverse, Buick Enclave and GMC Acadia
 First rear seat airbag – 2021 Mercedes Benz S Class

Tires
First use of pneumatic tires – 1895 Peugeot L'Eclair (Michelin)
First standard pneumatic tires – 1896 Bollée Voiturette
First radial-ply tires – 1946 Michelin "X" (Optional fitment on 1949 Peugeots, Citroën 11CV and Simca 8, standard on the 1950 Lancia Aurelia)
First self-repairing tires – 1950 Goodyear
First run flat tire – 1974 Mini 1275GT (Dunlop Denovo; optional)

Lighting
 First electrical lighting – 1898 Columbia electric
 First bright headlamps – 1899 Bleriot carbide generator
 First standard lights – 1904 "Prest-O-Lite" acetylene
 First standard electrical lights – 1908 Peerless
 First integrated electrical and lighting system – 1912 Cadillac Model 1912 Delco
 First "dipping" headlamps – 1915 Guide Lamp Company
 First original-equipment (OEM) "dipping" headlamps – 1917 Cadillac
 First stop or brake lights – 1919 Phianna
 First dual-beam headlamp – 1924 Bilux
 First directional headlamps – 1934 Tatra 77
 First hidden headlamps – 1935 (for the 1936 model year) Cord 810 (hand cranked from dash)
 First flush mounted taillights with the body – 1935 (for the 1936 model year) Cord 810
 First fog lights – 1937 (for the 1938 model year) Cadillac
 First power hidden headlamps – 1938 Buick Y-Job
 First production power hidden headlamps – 1941 (for the 1942 model year) DeSoto (standard)
 First auto-dimming headlamps – 1951 (for the 1952 model year) Cadillac and Oldsmobile (Autronic Eye)
 First auto-on/off headlamps – 1959 (for the 1960 model year) Buick (Twilight Sentinel)
 First headlamp wipers – 1970 Saab (95, 96, 99)
 First AC HID (lowbeam only) lights – 1991 BMW 7 Series (E32)
 First neon lights – 1994 (for the 1995 model year) Ford Explorer
 First DC HID lights – 1996 (for the 1997 model year) Lincoln Mark VIII
 First all-LED tail lights – 1998 Maserati 3200 GT
 First lowbeam/highbeam HID headlamps (Bi-Xenon) – 1999 on Mercedes-Benz CL-Class
 First all-LED headlamps – 2007 Audi R8
 First low beam, front position light and sidemarker LED headlights – 2008 Lexus LS600h
 First continuously adaptive highbeam (HID) – 2009 on the Mercedes-Benz E-Class (W212)
 First headlamps with pedestrian highlighting/warning – in 2011 on Mercedes-Benz CL-Class (C216)
 First full-LED car + tail lights with automatic variable intensity control – 2013 on the Mercedes-Benz S-Class (W222)
 First laser headlights – 2014 Audi R8 LMX

Electrical system
 First magneto – 1897 Lanchester Motor Company
 First electric self-starter – Arnold (copy of the Benz Velo) before 1900.
 First power door locks – 1914 Scripps-Booth
 First twin-spark engine – 1914 Alfa Romeo Grand Prix
 First electric power windows – 1938 Buick Y-Job (see "Other" for nonelectric production power windows)
 First combination key and ignition switch – 1948 (for the 1949 model year) Chrysler
 First 12 volt system – 1948 Lancia Ardea mk3
 First alternator – 1959 (for the 1960 model year) Plymouth Valiant
 First sealed battery – 1969 (for the 1970 model year) Pontiac "Freedom Battery"
 First keyless entry system (by keypad) – 1980 for the 8th gen Ford Thunderbird, 5th gen Mercury Cougar, and Lincoln Continental Mk VI, and Town Car
 First multiplexing wiring – 1986 (for the 1987 model year) Cadillac Allanté & Chrysler C-Body [1988]
 First integrated car systems control – 1987 Toyota Soarer (Electro Multi Vision)

Climate control
 First exhaust system heat – 1917 (???)
 First cooling system heat – 1926 (???) (Cadillac also lists heat as an option for $32 in the 1926 model year although it is not clear what the source is)
 First automobile air conditioning – 1939 (for the 1940 model year) Packard
 First automatic climate control – 1963 (for the 1964 model year) Cadillac
 First heated seats – 1965 (for the 1966 model year) Cadillac
 First digital climate control – 1975 Rolls-Royce Camargue
 First electrically heated windshield – 1985 Ford Scorpio/Granada Mk. III and 1986 model year Ford Taurus/Mercury Sable
 First ventilated seats – 1998 Saab 9-5
 First cooled seats – 2000 Lincoln Navigator
 First heated steering wheel – 2001 Audi A6 and BMW 7 Series

In-car entertainment
First radio – May 1922 Ford Model T (fitted to the passenger door by 18-year-old George Frost, president of the Lane High School Radio Club in Chicago)
First radio installed by a corporation – November 1922 Daimler (installed in a limousine by the Marconi-phone company)
First aftermarket radio – 1923 Springfield Body Corporation
First original-equipment (OEM) radio – 1929 (for the 1930 model year) Cadillac and LaSalle
First in-car phonograph – 1955 (for the 1956 model year) Chrysler (optional on all makes)
First FM radio – 1958 (for the 1959 model year) Lincoln
First stereo – 1964 (for the 1965 model year) full-size Chevrolet
First 8-track tape – 1965 (for the 1966 model year) Lincoln and Ford Thunderbird and Mustang
First Compact Cassette – 1977 (for the 1978 model year) Cadillac and Buick (except Skyhawk)
First steering wheel mounted audio controls – 1984 Nissan 300ZX AE
First compact disc – 1986 (for the 1987 model year) Lincoln Town Car
First active audio volume control – 1989 (for the 1990 model year) Chevrolet Corvette Bose/Delco Gold Series
First front auxiliary input (for portable devices) (OEM systems) – 1991 Mitsubishi 3000GT and Galant VR-4
First VCR – 1998 Oldsmobile Silhouette
First Bluetooth-capable audio system – 2003 Saab 9-3
First MP3-capable audio system – 2001 Mazda Protegé MP3
First karaoke – 2003 Geely BL
First 5.1 surround sound – 2004 Acura TL
First in-car iPod player integration – 2004 BMW
First active noise cancellation – 2005 Acura RL
First built-in USB port – 2006 Kia Rondo

Other
 First anti-theft device – 1930 Ansaldo Tipo 22
 First power windows – 1939 (for the 1940 model year) Packard 180 (hydro-electric)
 First power seat – 1947 (for the 1948 model year) Cadillac, Buick and Oldsmobile (hydraulic)
 First split folding rear seats – 1959 Auto Union (all makes)
 First composite wheels – 1970 Citroën SM
 First production car to achieve  – 1987 Ruf CTR in April 1987
 First standard composite wheels – 1989 Shelby CSX
 First active exhaust – 1991 Mitsubishi 3000GT

Pre-war
 Best-selling pre-war vehicle – Ford Model-T (15,000,000 sold between 1908 and 1928) Least-expensive –  – 1922 Briggs & Stratton Flyer
 Least-expensive full-featured automobile –  – 1926–27 (for the 1927 model year) Ford Model-T
 Fastest pre-war stock production vehicle – Cord Automobile – 1937 supercharged 812 Beverly sedan  – September 1937 at the Bonneville Salt Flats
 Fastest pre-war limited production vehicle – Alfa Romeo 8C 2900 – 1939 Alfa Romeo 8C 2900 clocked to  average at Brooklands Speedway (41 made)''
 Fastest pre-war vehicle – Railton Mobil Special – 2-SC Napier Lion V-12 –  – Driver John Cobb on 23 August 1939 at the Bonneville Salt Flats
 Longest pre-war production –  – 1933–35 (for the 1934–35 model years) Cadillac V-16
 Longest pre-war limited production –  1927–33 Bugatti Royale
 Longest pre-war production wheelbase –  – 1933–37 (for the 1934–37 model years) Cadillac V-16
 Longest pre-war limited production wheelbase –  1927 Bugatti Royale Prototype
 Longest pre-war Production convertible –  (29 produced) – 1933–1935 (for the 1934–35 model years) Cadillac V-16
 Longest pre-war Production coupe –  (20 produced) – 1933–1935 (for the 1934–35 model years) Cadillac V-16
 Longest pre-war Limited production convertible –  – 1932 Bugatti Royale Weinberger
 Longest pre-war Limited production coupe –  – 1931 Bugatti Royale Kellner
 Widest pre-war –  1938–43 Mercedes-Benz 770 W150 (armoured)
 Widest pre-war front track –  – 1938–43 Mercedes-Benz 770 W150
 Widest pre-war rear track –  – 1938–43 Mercedes-Benz 770 W150
 Tallest pre-war production car –  – 1904–09 Fiat 60 HP
 Heaviest pre-war curb weight –  – 1938–43 Mercedes-Benz 770 W150 (armoured)
 Largest pre-war limited production car inline-four engine  1911 Fiat S76 Record
 Largest pre-war straight-6 –  – 1920-28 Reanault 40CV
 Largest pre-war limited production straight-8 –  – 1927 Bugatti Royale
 Largest pre-war V8 –  – 1910–12 De Dion-Bouton
 Largest pre-war V12 –  – 1912 Pierce-Arrow
 Largest pre-war V16 –  – 1930–33 (for the 1931–33 model years) Marmon Series 16

See also
List of largest machines (including land vehicles)
Units of measurement
International System of Units
United States customary units
Imperial units
Power
Torque
Mass

References

Superlatives
Automobiles